Drew is a city in Sunflower County, Mississippi. The population was 1,927 at the 2010 census. Drew is in the vicinity of several plantations and the Mississippi State Penitentiary, a Mississippi Department of Corrections prison for men. It is noted for several racist murders, including the lynching of Emmett Till in 1955.

History

When the Yellow Dog Railroad was extended through what is now Drew, the post office was moved from the Promised Land Plantation to the Drew location. The settlement and Post Office were named for Miss Drew Daniel, daughter of Andrew Jackson Daniel.

A school called the Little Red Schoolhouse was built by matching funds from the Rosenwald Fund in 1928. In the 21st century it received a grant for renovation of the large school.

In the 1920s, a man named Joe Pullen was lynched near Drew after killing 13 members of his lynch mob and injuring 26 of them.

One historian wrote that the white residents of Drew had "traditionally been regarded as the most recalcitrant in the county on racial matters." The author wrote that whites in Drew were "considered the most recalcitrant of Sunflower County, and perhaps the state."  He also claimed that Drew's proximity to the Mississippi State Penitentiary made Drew "a dangerous place to be black", and claimed that during the 1930s and 1940s many police officers arbitrarily shot blacks, saying that they appeared to look like escaped prisoners.  That historian also claimed that during the Civil Rights Movement, when attempts were made to move Fannie Lou Hamer's movement for poor people from Ruleville to Drew, the organizers "faced stiff resistance".  Mae Bertha Carter, a major figure in the area civil rights movement, was from Drew.

In August of 1955, 14 year old Emmett Till was tortured and murdered in a barn near Drew. His killers then disposed of his body in the nearby Tallahatchie River. The racist lynching became nationally known for its brutality, and because of Till's mother's choice to have an open-casket funeral for her son. According to the FBI agent assigned to the case, the killers chose the barn in Drew because they thought it was a place where no one who would object to the murder would see or overhear the events. However, a young man from Drew named Willie Reed witnessed the murder and testified in court. The accused murderers were acquitted in court, but later confessed to the killing in a magazine interview. The site of the killing is located on private property.

Joetha Collier, often misspelled by the media in the past as Jo Etha Collier, was one of many African-Americans to attend Drew High School starting in the fall of 1970, and was shot to death in 1971 at age 18.

Some locals have raised money to purchase the barn where Till was murdered, for the purpose of building a memorial. As of 2021 this is unfinished.

Geography
Because of its small size, Billy Turner of The Times-Picayune said "[y]ou can travel all over town in a few minutes." Drew is in the vicinity of several plantations and the Mississippi State Penitentiary (Parchman), a Mississippi Department of Corrections prison for men.

Drew, in northern Sunflower County, is located on U.S. Route 49W, on the route between Jackson and Clarksdale. Drew is north of Yazoo City.

Many houses in Drew are government-owned. Some houses sold for $6,000 to $8,000 in the year until Saturday January 26, 2008. Some Drew residents said in 2008 that some houses, if put on the market, would sell for over $120,000.

Demographics

2020 census

As of the 2020 United States Census, there were 1,852 people, 729 households, and 503 families residing in the city.

2010 census
As of the 2010 United States Census, there were 1,927 people living in the city. The racial makeup of the city was 82.7% Black, 16.0% White, 0.2% Native American, 0.2% Asian and 0.2% from two or more races. 0.7% were Hispanic or Latino of any race.

2000 census
As of the census of 2000, there were 2,434 people, 811 households, and 606 families living in the city. The population density was 2,172.6 people per square mile (839.1/km2). There were 922 housing units at an average density of 823.0 per square mile (317.8/km2). The racial makeup of the city was 25.27% White, 73.58% African American, 0.12% Native American, 0.16% Asian, 0.37% from other races, and 0.49% from two or more races. Hispanic or Latino of any race were 1.56% of the population.

There were 811 households, out of which 42.4% had children under the age of 18 living with them, 35.3% were married couples living together, 35.4% had a female householder with no husband present, and 25.2% were non-families. 21.6% of all households were made up of individuals, and 10.7% had someone living alone who was 65 years of age or older. The average household size was 3.00 and the average family size was 3.51.

In the city, the population was spread out, with 36.6% under the age of 18, 10.1% from 18 to 24, 26.2% from 25 to 44, 16.2% from 45 to 64, and 10.8% who were 65 years of age or older. The median age was 27 years. For every 100 females, there were 82.9 males. For every 100 females age 18 and over, there were 71.9 males.

The median income for a household in the city was $19,167, and the median income for a family was $20,469. Males had a median income of $22,351 versus $18,693 for females. The per capita income for the city was $8,569. About 36.1% of families and 40.5% of the population were below the poverty line, including 54.6% of those under age 18 and 23.0% of those age 65 or over.

Government and infrastructure
Drew includes some large brick buildings that serve as public housing.

The United States Postal Service operates the Drew Post Office.

Economy
At one time, Drew was the locality in the United States that had the most cotton gins. In 2008, it only had one cotton gin. Billy Turner of The Times-Picayune said "[t]here's some corn, some beans, but mostly, there's no business." By 2012 the SuperValu grocery store had closed. Melanie Townsend, a woman quoted in a 2012 Bolivar Commercial article, said that since the grocery store closed, few employment opportunities were available in Drew and that the Drew School District was the largest employer in the area.

Education
The City of Drew is served by the Sunflower County Consolidated School District. Elementary and middle school students attend schools in Drew: A. W. James Elementary School (K-5) and Drew Hunter Middle School (6-8). High school students attend Ruleville Central High School in Ruleville.

The school originated as a segregation academy, 
Mississippi Delta Community College has the Drew Center in Drew.

The Sunflower County Library operates the Drew Public Library.

History of education
Previously it was served by the predominantly African-American Drew School District. Prior to closure, the district's schools were Drew Hunter High School and A.W. James Elementary School. Prior to the 2010–2011 school year the school district had three school buildings, including A.W. James Elementary School, Hunter Middle School, and Drew High School. The Drew district was merged into Sunflower County schools in 2012. That year Drew High School's high school division was closed. High school students began attending Ruleville Central High School.

Prior to Federal Government Forced Integration, beginning with the 1970–1971 school year, the Drew school district had four school buildings: the predominantly and historically white Drew High School and A.W. James Elementary, and the newer African-American Hunter High School and the Lil’ Red Rosenwald School, which now houses a community center.

The Mae Bertha Carter children were the first and only African-Americans to attend otherwise all-white schools in the county. Joetha Collier, often misspelled by the media in the past as Jo Etha Collier, was one of many African-Americans to attend Drew High School starting in the fall of 1970, and was shot to death in 1971 at age 18. As of July 1, 2012, the Drew School District was consolidated with the Sunflower County School District. Drew Hunter closed as of that date, with high school students rezoned to Ruleville Central High School.

Transportation
Ruleville-Drew Airport is in unincorporated Sunflower County, between Drew and Ruleville. The airport is jointly operated by the cities of Drew and Ruleville.

Notable people

Mae Bertha Carter, Civil Rights activist.
Boo Boo Davis, blues singer, released an album entitled Drew, Mississippi.
Al Dixon, football player.
Harold Dorman, rock and roll singer and songwriter.
William Eggleston, internationally famous groundbreaking photographer, grew up in Drew.
Willie Louis, born Willie Reed, witness to the murder of Emmett Till.
Archie Manning, former NFL quarterback.
Billy Stacy, football player.
Pops Staples and Cleotha Staples, members of The Staple Singers.

References
 

Tommy Johnson Blues Musician (1920s - 1930s) msbluestrail.org

Notes

External links

 Drew Chamber of Commerce (Archive)
 Drew Hunter Middle School
 A. W. James Elementary School

Cities in Mississippi
Cities in Sunflower County, Mississippi